Dee Brown may refer to:

 Dee Brown (American football) (born 1978), American professional football player
 Dee Brown (baseball) (born 1978), American professional baseball player
 Dee Brown (basketball, born 1968), American basketball player, coach, and commentator
 Dee Brown (basketball, born 1984), American basketball player
 Dee Brown (writer) (1908–2002), American novelist and historian
 Dee Brown (politician) (born 1948), American politician

See also 
 List of people with surname Brown
 Dee (disambiguation)